Fraser-Nicola is a provincial electoral district in British Columbia, Canada, established by the Electoral Districts Act, 2008. It was first contested in the 2009 general election.

Geography
As of the 2020 provincial election, Fraser-Nicola comprises the southwestern portion of the Thompson-Nicola Regional District, eastern portion of the Squamish-Lillooet Regional District and the eastern portion of the Fraser Valley Regional District. It is located in southern British Columbia. Communities in the electoral district consist of Merritt, Hope, Lillooet, Logan Lake, Lytton, Ashcroft, and Cache Creek.

Member of Legislative Assembly 
Because of the realignment of electoral boundaries, most incumbents did not represent the entirety of their listed district during the preceding legislative term. Harry Lali (NDP), first elected in the 2005 election to the Yale-Lillooet riding, became the district's first MLA. He was defeated by Jackie Tegart in the 2013 election.

Electoral history 

|-
 
|NDP
|Harry Lali
|align="right"|6,703
|align="right"|49.12%
|align="right"|
|align="right"|$68,069

|-

|- style="background:white;"
! style="text-align:right;" colspan="3"|Total Valid Votes
!align="right"|13,647
!align="right"|100%
|- style="background:white;"
! style="text-align:right;" colspan="3"|Total Rejected Ballots
!align="right"|82
!align="right"|0.60%
|- style="background:white;"
! style="text-align:right;" colspan="3"|Turnout
!align="right"|13,729
!align="right"|63.38%
|}

References

British Columbia provincial electoral districts
Lillooet